Henricus cognata is a species of moth of the family Tortricidae. It is found in Mexico (Veracruz) and the southern United States.

References

Moths described in 1914
Henricus (moth)